The Yeomanry (Ireland) Act 1802 (42 Geo. III, c. 68) was an Act of Parliament of the United Kingdom affecting the Yeomanry and Volunteers, two of the forces raised in the United Kingdom for home defence. It only covered units in Ireland, with those in England, Wales, and Scotland provided for by the Yeomanry and Volunteers Act 1802.

The various units of Yeomanry and Volunteers had been raised during the French Revolutionary Wars, but were only meant to serve during wartime. With the Treaty of Amiens in March 1802, the legal basis for maintaining these forces had disappeared. The Act allowed these corps to continue in service during peacetime on a voluntary basis.

The Act provided that when units were on exercise (up to two days per month), the Government would provide pay, clothing, and weapons, and each troop was allowed one permanent paid sergeant. However, unlike the English act, the units would not be subject to military duty or discipline. As the militia ballot was hardly ever used in Ireland, the act did not provide any formal exemption for volunteers.

Notes

United Kingdom Acts of Parliament 1802
19th-century military history of the United Kingdom
United Kingdom military law
Repealed United Kingdom Acts of Parliament
British defence policymaking